The Kerala Film Critics Association Award for Best Supporting Actor is an award presented annually at the Kerala Film Critics Association Awards. It is given in honour of a male actor who has delivered an outstanding performance in a supporting role in a Malayalam film. The award was instituted in 2019 and succeeded the Kerala Film Critics Association Award for Second Best Actor which was awarded between the years 1979 and 2018.

The following list includes the winners of both Best Supporting Actor and Second Best Actor awards.

Second Best Actor (1979 – 2018)

Best Supporting Actor (2019 – present)

References

Supporting Actor
Film awards for supporting actor